Angels Camp, also known as City of Angels and formerly Angel's Camp, Angels, Angels City, Carson's Creek and Clearlake, is the only incorporated city in Calaveras County, California, United States. The population was 3,836 at the 2010 census, up from 3,004 at the 2000 census. It lies at an elevation of 1378 feet (420 m).

Mark Twain based his short story "The Celebrated Jumping Frog of Calaveras County" on a story he claimed to have heard at the Angels Hotel in 1865. The event is commemorated with a Jumping Frog Jubilee each May at the Calaveras County Fairgrounds, just east of the city. Because of this, Angels Camp is sometimes referred to as "Frogtown."

The city is California Historical Landmark #287.

History

Henry Angell, a native of Rhode Island, set up a tent store on the banks of the creek. The placers around his camp were productive but gave out after a few years, and the population began to dwindle until gold-bearing quartz veins were discovered in the town, which brought people back. Those mines operated for the next few decades, producing more than $20 million worth of gold, processed by stamp mills in town. It was said that when the last mill finally ceased operations, the townspeople couldn't sleep, the silence was so loud.

The first post office was established in 1851 (and called Carson's Creek). It was renamed along with the town in 1853. The city was incorporated under the name of "Angels" in 1912.

Geography

Climate
According to the Köppen Climate Classification system, Angels Camp has a hot-summer Mediterranean climate, abbreviated "Csa" on climate maps.

Demographics

2010
At the 2010 census Angels Camp had a population of 3,836. The racial makeup of Angels Camp was 3,329 (86.8%) White, 12 (0.3%) African American, 48 (1.3%) Native American, 49 (1.3%) Asian, 5 (0.1%) Pacific Islander, 270 (7.0%) from other races, and 123 (3.2%) from two or more races. Hispanic or Latino of any race were 498 people (13.0%).

The Census Bureau said 4,354 people (98.8% of the population) lived in households, 47 (1.2%) lived in non-institutionalized group quarters and no one was institutionalized.

There were 1,645 households, 422 (25.7%) had children younger than 18 living in them, 836 (50.8%) were opposite-sex married couples living together, 152 (9.2%) had a female householder with no husband present, 74 (4.5%) had a male householder with no wife present. There were 94 (5.7%) unmarried opposite-sex partnerships, and nine (0.5%) same-sex married couples or partnerships. A total of 489 households (29.7%) were one person and 252 (15.3%) had someone living alone who was 65 or older. The average household size was 2.30.  There were 1,062 families (64.6% of households); the average family size was 2.81.

The age distribution was 794 people (20.7%) younger than 18, 273 people (7.1%) aged 18 to 24, 810 people (21.1%) aged 25 to 44, 1,086 people (28.3%) aged 45 to 64, and 873 people (22.8%) who were 65 or older. The median age was 45.9 years. For every 100 females, there were 93.3 males. For every 100 females age 18 and older, there were 90.5 males.

The homeowner vacancy rate was 3.2%; the rental vacancy rate was 10.7%. A total of 2,355 people (61.4% of the population) lived in owner-occupied housing units and 1,434 people (37.4%)lived in rental housing units.

2000
As of the census of 2000, Angels Camp had 3,004 people in 1,286 households, including 856 families, in the city. The racial makeup of the city was 93.14% White, 0.20% Black or African American, 1.83% Native American, 0.47% Asian, 0.03% Pacific Islander, 1.43% from other races, and 2.90% from two or more races. Hispanic or Latino of any race were 8.09% of the population.

There were 1,286 households, 28.2% had children younger than 18 living with them, 49.3% were married couples living together, 12.3% had a female householder with no husband present and 33.4% were non-families. A total of 29.0% of households were made up of individuals, and 13.4% had someone living alone who was 65 or older. The average household size was 2.34, and the average family size was 2.82.

The age distribution was 24.3% younger than 18, 6.7% from 18 to 24, 24.7% from 25 to 44, 26.1% from 45 to 64, and 18.2% who were 65 or older.  The median age was 41 years. For every 100 females, there were 92.4 males. For every 100 females age 18 and older, there were 87.1 males.

The median income for a household in the city was $33,371, and the median family income  was $48,125. Males had a median income of $37,269 vs. $27,778 for females. The per capita income for the city was $19,599.  About 10.0% of families and 13.0% of the population were below the poverty line, including 15.2% of those younger than 18 and 10.0% of those age 65 or older.

Government

Notable people
Sara Carter, member of the musical group the Carter Family
T.J. Dillashaw, former UFC bantamweight champion
Amanda Folendorf, first deaf female mayor in the United States 
Mike McCormick, Major League Baseball player
Catfish Metkovich, Major League Baseball player
Kyle Rasmussen, United States Ski Team member and two-time Alpine skiing World Cup Downhill champion
Tommy Orange, Native American writer and novelist

References

External links

Cities in Calaveras County, California
Mining communities of the California Gold Rush
Populated places in the Sierra Nevada (United States)
California Historical Landmarks
Incorporated cities and towns in California
Populated places established in 1848
1848 establishments in California
1912 establishments in California
Historic American Buildings Survey in California